The  was a transport submarine built for the Imperial Japanese Navy (IJN) during World War II. The IJN planned to build 12 boats, but only 10 vessels were completed by the end of the war. The IJN called these submarines .

Several boats were converted to tankers or mother ships for the  midget submarines.

Design and description
The Ha-101-class submarines were designed as small, cheap transport submarines to resupply isolated island garrisons. They displaced  surfaced and  submerged. They were designed to carry  of cargo.

For surface running, the boats were powered by a single  diesel engine that drove one propeller shaft. When submerged the propeller was driven by a  electric motor. They could reach  on the surface and  underwater. The boats were armed a single mount for a  Type 96 anti-aircraft gun.

Planned construction
Project number S57. In February 1944, the IJN planned a small-size transport submarine, the IJA planned the Maru Yu.

Boats

See also
Type 4 Ka-Tsu
Imperial Japanese Army Railways and Shipping Section
Type 3 submergence transport vehicle, Yu II type

Footnotes

Bibliography
 

 , History of Pacific War Extra, "Perfect guide, The submarines of the Imperial Japanese Forces", Gakken (Japan), March 2005, 
 Ships of the World special issue Vol.37, History of Japanese Submarines, (Japan), August 1993
 The Maru Special, Japanese Naval Vessels No.43 Japanese Submarines III, Ushio Shobō (Japan), September 1980, Book code 68343-43
 The Maru Special, Japanese Naval Vessels No.132 Japanese Submarines I "Revised edition", Ushio Shobō (Japan), February 1988, Book code 68344-36
 Senshi Sōsho Vol.88, Naval armaments and war preparation (2), "And after the outbreak of war", Asagumo Simbun (Japan), October 1975

Submarine classes
Submarines of the Imperial Japanese Navy
Merchant submarines